The 1996 Royal Rumble was the ninth annual Royal Rumble professional wrestling pay-per-view (PPV) event produced by the World Wrestling Federation (WWF, now WWE). It took place on January 21, 1996, at the Selland Arena in Fresno, California. As has been customary since 1993, the Royal Rumble match winner received a world championship match at that year's WrestleMania. For the 1996 event, the winner received a match for the WWF World Heavyweight Championship at WrestleMania XII.

The main event saw The Undertaker face Bret Hart for the WWF World Heavyweight Championship, where Undertaker won via disqualification due to interference from Diesel; Hart retained as titles do not change hands on disqualification unless stipulated. The undercard featured the 1996 Royal Rumble match, which Shawn Michaels won by last eliminating Diesel, becoming the second person to win the Royal Rumble match twice, and back-to-back, after Hulk Hogan.

Production

Background
The Royal Rumble is an annual gimmick pay-per-view (PPV), produced every January by the World Wrestling Federation (WWF, now WWE) since 1988. It is one of the promotion's original four pay-per-views, along with WrestleMania, SummerSlam, and Survivor Series, which were dubbed the "Big Four", and was considered one of the "Big Five" PPVs, along with King of the Ring. It is named after the Royal Rumble match, a modified battle royal in which the participants enter at timed intervals instead of all beginning in the ring at the same time. The match generally features 30 wrestlers and the winner traditionally earns a world championship match at that year's WrestleMania. For 1996, the winner earned a match for the WWF World Heavyweight Championship at WrestleMania XII. The 1996 event was the ninth event in the Royal Rumble chronology and was scheduled to be held on January 21, 1996, at the Selland Arena in Fresno, California.

Storylines 
The card consisted of five matches. The matches resulted from scripted storylines, where wrestlers portrayed heroes, villains, or less distinguishable characters to build tension and culminated in a wrestling match or series of matches. Results were predetermined by WWF's writers, with storylines produced on their weekly television show, Raw.

Event
In a match occurring on the Free For All preshow, Duke "The Dumpster" Droese defeated Hunter Hearst Helmsley. WWF president Gorilla Monsoon stepped in after Droese was pinned and reversed the referee's decision, disqualifying Helmsley for using brass knuckles to knock Droese out. As a result, Droese won the right to be entry number 30 in the Royal Rumble match, while Helmsley had to enter first.

Featured matches on the undercard were the 1996 Royal Rumble match which was won by Shawn Michaels, who last eliminated Diesel to win the match, making it his second straight Royal Rumble win; Goldust defeating Razor Ramon for the WWF Intercontinental Championship; and The Smoking Gunns (Billy Gunn and Bart Gunn) defeating The Bodydonnas (Skip and Zip) to retain the WWF Tag Team Championship.

Aftermath
The 1996 Royal Rumble marked the first pay-per-view appearance of Steve Austin, here using the name "The Ringmaster," a blond-haired master ring technician and the featured wrestler in the "Million Dollar Man" Ted DiBiase's stable. His elimination was accidental as he was supposed to be in the final four, but he slipped on the ropes and fell out when he was doing a spot with Fatu. In the weeks following the Royal Rumble, "The Ringmaster" gimmick was met with lukewarm reaction from fans, prompting Austin to create a new look and gimmick for himself: the "Stone Cold" gimmick, that of a foul-mouthed individual who drank beer and freely spoke his mind, uncaring of who he angered or whether he had friends (he often attacked heel and face alike), openly disregarded the rules and fought until his last breath. As "Stone Cold," Austin—who began his first major feud, with Savio Vega, under "The Ringmaster" moniker and continued it after changing his gimmick—went on to become one of the WWF's biggest stars and helped usher in the promotion's Attitude Era.

Results

Royal Rumble entrances and eliminations
A new entrant came out approximately every 2 minutes.

 – Winner

 This was King Mabel's last appearance until he returned on June 30, 1998, for a one-off match with Ken Shamrock on Raw Is War.

Other on-screen personnel

References

External links
Official website
Results at Online World of Wrestling

1996
1996 in California
Professional wrestling in California
Events in California
1996 WWF pay-per-view events
January 1996 events in the United States